Ayumi Hamasaki Countdown Live 2011–2012 A: Hotel Love Songs is Japanese pop singer Ayumi Hamasaki's 11th Countdown concert DVD.

Track list
 do it again
 Happening Here
 insomnia
 MOON
 fated
 feedback
 NEVER EVER
 sending mail
 machine
 Sparkle
 Humming 7/4
 evolution
 RAINBOW
 November
 music
 Ladies Night
 Party queen
 Happening Here
 Love song
 how beautiful you are
 Trauma ～ Boys & Girls
 MY ALL

References

Ayumi Hamasaki video albums
Live video albums
Albums recorded at the Yoyogi National Gymnasium